John Carter Dunning  (born 1934) is a British businessman and the founder of Westmorland Motorway Services, which runs motorway service stations in England, and is best known for Tebay Services.

Dunning began his career in farming in 1956. The 900-acre Cumbrian hill farm was focused on sheep cattle.

Dunning started Tebay Services on his family farm in 1972.

He is married to Barbara. Their daughter Sarah left a City career to become actively involved in the business, and is chair and a co-owner of Westmorland. Their other daughter, Jane Lane, runs the farm.

In the 1992 Birthday Honours he was made a Commander of the Order of the British Empire, "For public service in Cumbria."

References

Living people
British company founders
British chief executives
20th-century British farmers
1934 births
Commanders of the Order of the British Empire
People from Cumbria
21st-century British farmers